Deepak Prabhu Ahuja is an Indian-American financial executive working in the life sciences industry who previously worked in the automotive manufacturing industry. He is best known for being the former CFO of Tesla.

Ahuja holds a bachelor's degree in ceramic engineering from Indian Institute of Technology (BHU), Varanasi and a master's degree from Robert R. McCormick School of Engineering and Applied Science of Northwestern University.  Ahuja enrolled at Northwestern University in 1985, with his first class being taught by Morris E. Fine.

Ahuja spent six years working for Kennametal near Pittsburgh, and obtained a Master of Business Administration qualification from Carnegie Mellon University.

In 1993 Ahuja moved to Woodhaven, Michigan, to accept a job with the Ford Motor Company.  He became Chief Financial Officer (CFO) of the AutoAlliance International joint-venture between Ford and Mazda.  Ahuja then moved to become CFO of Ford in Southern Africa.  He then returned to Michigan to act as controller of Ford's fuel-efficient small cars product development programme.

On 13 June 2008 Ahuja was offered the position of Chief Financial Officer at Tesla Motors, reporting to CEO and president Ze'ev Drori.  In 2015 Ahuja retired from Tesla, and then returned as Chief Financial Officer again in February 2017 to replace Jason Wheeler. His retirement from Tesla after 11 years was announced on the Q4 2018 Tesla earnings call on January 30, 2019.

In January 2020, Ahuja joined Verily as its chief financial officer. In September 2022, it was announced that Ahuja would leave Verily and join Zipline as its first chief business and financial officer from September 30.

References

Further reading

External links
 

1963 births
Living people
Tesla, Inc. people
Banaras Hindu University alumni
Northwestern University alumni
Carnegie Mellon University alumni